Paramount (from the word paramount meaning "above all others") may refer to:

Entertainment and music companies
 Paramount Global, also known simply as Paramount, an American mass media company formerly known as ViacomCBS. The following businesses are historically linked to this company, but not all are related by current ownership.
Paramount+, an American streaming video service formerly known as CBS All Access
Paramount Animation, an animation studio and division of Paramount Pictures founded in 2011
Paramount Communications, a company known as Gulf and Western Industries until 1989, acquired by Viacom in 1994
Paramount Home Entertainment, a division of Paramount Pictures for home video distribution founded in 1976
Paramount Network, a current cable network previously called TNN and Spike TV
Paramount Parks, a former subsidiary chain of theme parks
Paramount Pictures, an American film studio, that serves as Paramount Global's namesake
Paramount Players, a contemporary film division of Paramount Pictures founded in 2017
Paramount Records (1969), a defunct record label subsidiary
Paramount Stations Group (PSG), a television stations group
Paramount Television Studios, the current incarnation of Paramount Television, 2013–present
Paramount Television (original), the original incarnation of Paramount Television, active 1967–2006
Paramount Television Network (PTN), a defunct TV network founded in the late 1940s
Paramount Television Service (PTVS), a planned, but aborted, commercial television network from the late 1970s
Paramount Vantage, a specialty film division of Paramount Pictures founded (as Paramount Classics) in 1998
United Paramount Network (UPN), a defunct American television network in existence from 1995 to 2006
United Paramount Theatres, a defunct movie theater chain
Paramount Records, American jazz and blues label

Other companies
Paramount Resources, a Canadian petroleum company
Paramount Group, a South African defense company

Places
Paramount Fine Foods Centre, an auditorium in Mississauga, Ontario, Canada

Transportation
Paramount Airways, an airline based in Chennai, India
Paramount Cars, a specialist British car maker active between 1950 and 1956
Schwinn Paramount, a high-end racing bicycle

Other uses
Paramount (Shanghai), a Chinese historical nightclub and dance hall
Paramount, California, U.S., a city in Los Angeles County
The Paramount at Buckhead, a residential skyscraper in Atlanta, Georgia, U.S.
Paramount Building at 1501 Broadway, Manhattan, New York, U.S.
Paramount chief, the highest-level political leader in a region or country
Paramount Hotel on 46th Street, Manhattan, New York, U.S.
Paramount leader, the highest leader in the People's Republic of China
Paramount Plaza at 1633 Broadway, Manhattan, New York, U.S.
Lord paramount, a lord who held his fief from no superior authority
Paramount, a difficulty level in Dance Dance Revolution

See also
Paramount Theater (disambiguation)